Chonlasit Upanigkit (born 1990) is a Thai film editor. He is a frequent collaborator with Nawapol Thamrongrattanarit and other Thai independent directors. He has worked on feature films such as Mary Is Happy, Mary Is Happy (2013), Heart Attack (2015), and Bad Genius (2017), all of which won the Suphannahong Award for Best Editing.

Filmography

References

External links
 

Chonlasit Upanigkit
1990 births
Living people